This is a list of television programs formerly and currently broadcast by the cable television channel TRT 1 in Turkey.

Current programming

The following is a list of original TRT 1 programs that are currently in production and are being broadcast on the channel.

Historical 

 Diriliş: Ertuğrul (2014-2019)
Payitaht: Abdülhamid (2017–2021)
Alparslan: Büyük Selçuklu (2021-present)
Uyanış: Büyük Selçuklu (2020–2021)
Bir Zamanlar Kıbrıs (2021–2022)
Tozkoparan İskender (2021-present)

Drama 
Masumlar Apartmanı (2020–present)
Teşkilat (2021-present)

Comedy

 Seksenler (2012–2016; 2019–present)

Talk shows

Pelin Çift İle Gündem Ötesi (2015–present)

Sports

 UEFA Champions League (2015–present)
 UEFA Europa League (2015–present)
 UEFA Super Cup (2015–present)

Reality/documentary

Ana Ocağı (2014–present)

Former programming
The following is a list of TRT 1 original programs that have appeared on the channel in the past.

Domestica

 1970: Kaçaklar
 1974: Yılkı Atı
 1974: Sokak Şarkıcıları
 1974: Ahududu
 1974: Hartlineden Hititlere
 1974: Kaynanalar
 1975: Aşk-ı Memnu
 1975: Diyet
 1975: Ferman
 1975: Pembe İncili Kaftan
 1975: Topuz
 1976: Darısı Başınıza
 1976: Caniko
 1977: Seyahatname
 1977: Annemi Hatırlıyorum
 1977: Hakem Seyfi Dalmaz
 1977: Şıpsevdi
 1977: Çözülme
 1977: Bir Yürek Satıldı
 1977: Oynaş
 1977: Çok Sesli Bir Ölüm
 1977: İstanbul
 1978: Bağrıyanık Ömer ile Güzel Zeynep
 1978: At Gözlüğü
 1978: Denizin Kanı
 1978: Bizim Sınıf
 1978: Giyim Kuşam Dünyası
 1978: Evdekiler
 1978: Bir Kadının Penceresinden
 1979: Yorgun Savaşçı
 1979: Paranın Kiri
 1979: Tatlı Çarşamba
 1979: İbiş'in Rüyası
 1979: Bir Ceza Avukatının Anıları: Emekli Başkan
 1980: İttihat Ve Terakki
 1980: Annem Annem
 1980: Sizin Dersane
 1980: Sönmüş Ocak
 1980: Mahmut Mangal
 1980: Hikayelerden Biri
 1981: IV. Murat
 1981: Bağdat Hatun
 1981: Zaman Mekan Makinesi
 1981: Flamingo Yolu
 1982: Hacı Arif Bey
 1982: Dost Eller
 1982: Sekiz Sütuna Manşet
 1982: Tohum ve Toprak
 1982: Chambre 666
 1982: Preveze Öncesi
 1983: Kartallar Yüksek Uçar
 1983: Üç İstanbul
 1983: Yalancı Dünya
 1983: Kurt ve Kuzu
 1983: Alçaktan Uçan Güvercin
 1983: Çıplak Ayak
 1983: Kuruntu Ailesi
 1984: Küçük Ağa
 1984: Aliş ile Zeynep
 1984: Fotoğraftakiler
 1984: Köşe Dönücü
 1984: Parkta Bir Sonbahar Günüydü
 1984: Skape'nin Dolapları
 1984: Yalnızlar
 1984: Sessiz Film
 1985: 32. Gün
 1985: Kaçaklar
 1985: Türk Vakıf Medeniyetleri
 1985: Dokuzuncu Hariciye
 1985: Kırık Hayatlar
 1985: Acımak
 1985: Bay Alkolü Takdimimdir
 1985: Parmak Damgası
 1985: Bugünün Saraylısı
 1986: Ahmet Hamdi Tanpınar
 1986: Altınkuş Musiki Cemiyeti
 1986: Bizi Güldürenler
 1986: Çalıkuşu
 1986: Duvardaki Kan
 1986: Gazoz Ağacı
 1986: Gönül İşi
 1986: Mardin-Münih Hattı
 1986: Ölümünün Ellinci Yılında M. Akif Ersoy
 1986: Perihan Abla
 1986: Sevgiyi Öğrenen Adam
 1986: Sızı
 1986: Şey Bey
 1986: Uzak Kentin İnsanları (Köprü)
 1987: Bir Muharrir'in Ölümü
 1987: Bir Yabancı Konuk
 1987: Belene
 1987: Elif Ana-Ayşe Kız
 1987: Ferhunde Kalfa
 1987: Gecenin Öteki Yüzü
 1987: Gönül Dostları
 1987: Kavanozdaki Adam
 1987: Kuruluş/Osmancık
 1987: Saat Sabahın Dokuzu
 1987: Utanç Yılları
 1987: Yalnız Efe
 1987: Yarın Artık Bugündür
 1987: Yeniden Doğmak
 1987: Cesur ve Güzel
 1987: Uzaylı Zekiye
 1988: Yaprak Dökümü
 1988: Dünya Durdukça-Mimar Sinan
 1988: Hisseli Harikalar Kumpanyası
 1988: Necip Fazıl Kısakürek
 1988: Ateşten Günler
 1988: İlk Aşk
 1988: Halının Türküsü
 1988: Olacak O Kadar
 1988: Macide Öğretmen
 1988: Kavak Yelleri
 1988: Uğurlugil Ailesi
 1988: Dudaktan Kalbe
 1988: Eylül
 1988: Rıza Beyin Polisiye Öyküleri
 1988: Dönemeç
 1988: Keşanlı Ali Destanı
 1989: Bizimkiler
 1989: Avrupa'da Türk İzleri
 1989: Hünkarın Bir Günü
 1989: Beybaba
 1989: Geçmiş Bahar Mimozaları
 1989: İçimizden Biri: Yunus Emre
 1989: İslam'ın Şartları
 1989: Doktorlar
 1989: Lüküs Hayat
 1989: Manken
 1989: Beyaz Peçeli Kadın İstanbul da
 1989: Samanyolu
 1989: Gönüller Sultanı Mevlana
 1989: Kanun Savaşçıları
 1989: Hacı Bektaşı Veli
 1989: Türkmen Düğünü
 1989: Kaldırım Serçesi
 1989: Süleyman Çelebi ve Mevlid
 1989: İstanbul Efendisi
 1989: Köy Doktoru
 1989: Dullar Pansiyonu
 1989: Can Şenliği
 1989: Ayaşlı ve Kiracıları
 1989: Baharın Bittiği Yer
 1989: Ah Ana
 1989: Cahide
 1989: Çaylar Şirketten
 1989: Kirli Sarı
 1989: Gençler
 1989: Ahi Evran
 1989: 21. Yüzyıla Girerken Türk Ailesi
 1989: Tatlı Ali
 1990: Bizim Ev
 1990: Hayırlı Bir Konu
 1990: Boğaziçine Sığınanlar
 1990: Öyle Bir Şey
 1990: Hanımın Çiftliği
 1990: Kara Elmas
 1990: Duygu Çemberi
 1990: Yuva
 1990: Dilruba Hanım
 1990: Orta Bereket
 1990: Ah Şu Komşularımız
 1990: Küçük Dünya
 1990: Bir Milyara Bir Çocuk
 1990: Başka Olur Ağaların Düğünü
 1990: Fatih Harbiye
 1990: İstasyondaki Pastane
 1990: İz Peşinde
 1990: Hayat Ağacı
 1991: Yalnızlar
 1991: Aile Bağları
 1991: Bir Ömrün Bedeli
 1991: Peri Kızı
 1991: Varsayalım İsmail
 1991: Ahmet Hamdi Bey Ailesi
 1991: Kıssadan Hisseler
 1991: Yarına Gülümsemek
 1991: Anadolu'nun Kadın Erenleri
 1991: Vatandaş Ahmet Efendi
 1991: Geçmişe Açılan Pencere
 1991: Üçüncü Gözle
 1991: Yarınlardan Gelen Kız
 1992: Ayla Öğretmen
 1992: Aysarının Zilleri
 1992: Metamorfoz
 1992: Emret Muhtarım
 1992: Kopuk Dünyalar
 1993: Yaz Evi
 1993: Bizim Mahalle
 1993: Ferhunde Hanımlar
 1993: Yazlıkçılar
 1994: Ah Bir Büyümesek
 1994: Gülşen Abi
 1994: Hüsnü Bey Amca
 1994: Suçlu Kim
 1994: Geçmişin İzleri
 1994: Sonradan Görmeler
 1995: Bizim Aile
 1996: Cafe Casblanca
 1996: Kurtuluş
 1996: Şaşıfelek Çıkmazı
 1997: Eltiler
 1998: Üç Yapraklı Yonca
 1998: Karambol Kamil
 1998: Yerim Seni
 1999: Konu Komşu
 1999: Su Sinekleri
 1999: Ayrılsak da Beraberiz
 1999: Aile Bağları
 2000: Bizim Evin Halleri
 2000: Dikkat Bebek Var
 2000: Karakolda Ayna Var
 2000: Kurşun Kalem
 2000: Nisan Yağmuru
 2000: Üzgünüm Leyla
 2000: Yedi Numara
 2001: Baba Ocağı
 2001: Bir Filiz Vardı
 2001: Bizim Çocuklarımız
 2001: Dedem, Gofret ve Ben
 2001: Karanlıkta Koşanlar
 2001: Maria Bonita
 2001: Pas Çocuk
 2001: Tek Celse
 2001: Vasiyet
 2001: Yeditepe İstanbul
 2001: Çiçek Taksi
 2002: Canım Kocacığım
 2002: Evli ve Çocuksuz
 2002: Mihriban
 2002: En Son Babalar Duyar
 2002: Koçum Benim
 2002: Kuzenlerim
 2003: Havada Bulut
 2003: Kasabanın İncisi 
 2003: Yuvadan 1 Kuş Uçtu
 2003: Esir Şehrin İnsanları
 2003: Çınaraltı
 2003: 6. His
 2004: Aşk Buralara Uğramıyor
 2004: Şeytan Ayrıntıda Gizlidir
 2004: Kadirşinas
 2004: Aynalar
 2004: Ayışığı Neredesin
 2005: Ne Seninle Ne Sensiz
 2005: Cumbadan Rumbaya
 2005: Günün Adamı
 2005: Zeytin Dalı
 2005: Üç Kadın
 2006: Pertev Bey'in Üç Kızı
 2006: Hayat Türküsü
 2006: Hisarbuselik
 2007: Aşk Yeniden
 2007: Evimin Erkeği
 2007: Dede Korkut Masalları
 2007: Güzel Günler
 2007: İpucu: Krinimal
 2007: Kınalı Kuzular
 2007: Sarayın Rüzgarı
 2008: Babam Adam Olacak
 2008: Beni Unutma
 2008: Dalgakıran
 2008: Dur Yolcu
 2008: Her Halimle Sev Beni
 2008: Süper Babaanne
 2008: Sürgün Hayatlar
 2008: Mert ile Gert
 2008: İpsiz Recep
 2008: Kırmızı Işık
 2008: Doludizgin Yıllar
 2009: Bahar Dalları
 2009: Acemi Müezzin
 2009: Ah Kalbim
 2009: Alayına İsyan
 2009: Aynadaki Düşman
 2009: Ayrılık
 2009: Cam Kırıkları
 2009: Canını Sevdigim İstanbul'u
 2009: Çılgın Kanal
 2009: Çocukluk Günleri
 2009: Hesaplaşma
 2009: İstanbulda Aşık Oldum
 2009: Karşı Köyün Delisi
 2009: Kaybedenler
 2009: Kısaca Ramazan
 2009: 
 2009: Sivas: Aşıklar Bayramı
 2009: Yapma Diyorum
 2009: Hicran Yarası
 2009: Zoraki Başkan
 2009: Ramazan Güzeldir
 2009: Sakarya Fırat
 2010: Abur Cubur
 2010: Sınıf
 2010: Gökkuşağı Çocukları
 2010: Hanımeli Sokağı
 2010: Halil İbrahim Sofrası
 2010: Küstüm Çiçeği
 2010: Yerden Yüksek
 2010: Elde Var Hayat
 2011: Adım Bayram Bayram
 2011: Hayata Beş Kala
 2011: Kayıp Aranıyor
 2011: Komiser Rex
 2011: Mazi Kalbimde Yaradır
 2011: Su'dan Sebepler
 2011: Yamak Ahmet
 2011: Yeniden Başla
 2011: Başrolde Aşk
 2011: Küçük Hanımefendi
 2011: Mavi Kelebekler
 2011: Mor Menekşeler
 2011: Sen de Gitme
 2011: Tacir
 2011: Leyla ile Mecnun
 2011: Avrupa Avrupa
 2012: Bir Zamanlar Osmanlı
 2012: Bir Zamanlar Osmanlı: Kıyam
 2012: Bulutların Ötesi
 2012: Evvel Zaman Hikayesi
 2012: Esir Sultan
 2012: Korkma
 2012: Kurt Kanunu
 2012: Prensin Şarkısı
 2012: Sarayın Incisi
 2012: 6 Mantı
 2012: Şubat
 2012: Yol Ayrımı
 2012: Böyle Bitmesin
 2012: Zengin Kız Fakir Oğlan
 2013: Bir Yastıkta
 2013: En Uzun Yüzyıl
 2013: Eski Hikaye
 2013: Gurbette Aşk
 2013: Gönül Hırsızı
 2013: Osmanlı Tokadı
 2013: Beni Böyle Sev
 2014: Bir Yusuf Masalı
 2014: Hayat Ağacı
 2014: Kızılelma
 2014: Yedikule Hayat Yokuşu
 2014: Aşkın Kanunu
 2014: Şimdi Onlar Düşünsün
2014: Filnita
2014: Filinta
 2014: Yedi Güzel Adam
2015: Baba Candır
 2015: Heredot Cevdet Saati
2015: Milat
2017: Kalk Gidelim

Foreign shows or series

Escrava Isaura
Flamingo Road
Dempsey and Makepeace
Moonlighting
Golden Girls
Knight Rider
The Monroes
Barnaby Jones 
McMillan & Wife
The Citadel
Kung Fu
Shogun
Tales of the Gold Monkey
Voyagers! 
Falcon Crest
Yes Minister
Mission: Impossible
Dallas
Space: 1999
Perfect Strangers
L.A. Law 
The Life and Times of Grizzly Adams
Charles in Charge
The White Shadow
Bonanza
Miami Vice
Hart to Hart
Charlie's Angels
Petrocelli
Battlestar Galactica
Seven Brides for Seven Brothers
Roots
The Fugitive
The Onedin Line
The Waltons
Star Trek
Cheers 
Bewitched
Logan's Run
Blake's 7 
Magnum, P.I.
The Six Million Dollar Man
Little House on the Prairie
Taxi
Rich Man, Poor Man
Supergran 
The Persuaders!
The Saint
Maelstorm
Flipper
North and South
Amanda's
Run for Your Life
Silver Spoons
Webster
Robin of Sherwood
The Love Boat
The Streets of San Francisco
The Cosby Show
V
The Adventures of Black Beauty
The Avengers
Daktari
Quantum Leap
Santa Barbara
The Equalizer
Wish Me Luck
The Magician
Banacek
Police Woman
Baretta
Columbo
All My Children
Everybody Loves Raymond
CSI: Crime Scene Investigation
7th Heaven
Return to Eden
Father Knows Best
Holmes & Yo-Yo
Quincy, M.E.
Northern Exposure
McCoy
Roseanne
Eight Is Enough
Cagney & Lacey
Simon & Simon
seaQuest DSV
Life Goes On
Beverly Hills, 90210
Goof Troop
Kim Possible
Recess
American Dragon: Jake Long
Lilo & Stitch: The Series
Ocean Girl

Lists of television series by network
Original programming by Turkish television network or channel